The 4th Cavalry Brigade of the Imperial Japanese Army was originally formed April 1, 1909.
 
It was assigned to Kwantung Army in April 1933 as part of the IJA Cavalry Group. It was then assigned to the Cavalry Group to Northern China Area Army, June 1938. On September 5, 1939, 4th Cavalry Brigade was put directly under North China Area Army.  Again with the Group, it was assigned to Mongolia Garrison Army in February 1939.  Assigned to Twelfth Army in December 1942.

Organization 
4th Cavalry Brigade
 25th Cavalry Regiment
 26th Cavalry Regiment
 Brigade Mounted Artillery Regiment

Later additions
 Brigade Machinegun unit
 Brigade Anti-tank artillery squadron
 Brigade Tank unit
 Independent Infantry Battalion (motorized)
 Independent Engineer Squadron (motorized)
 4th Mounted Artillery Regiment
 72nd Cavalry Regiment

See also 
IJA Cavalry Units

Japanese World War II brigades
Military units and formations established in 1909
Military units and formations disestablished in 1945
1945 disestablishments in Japan